Samo Burja is a Slovenian political scientist and president of Bismarck Analysis, a political risk consultancy. Burja is a research fellow at the Long Now Foundation and the Foresight Institute, studying how institutions can persist in long-term settings. Burja is credited with developing Great Founder Theory. The theory hypothesizes that founders can impact global change through the creation of institutions that persist in the long-term, emphasizing the importance of human choice and construction in contrast with theories of institutionalism. He is a contributor to Palladium Magazine (published by the American Governance Foundation), Asia Times, City Journal, and The National Interest.

References

External links
 Samo Burja at Big Think
 Column archive at Palladium

Living people
Year of birth missing (living people)
Slovenian political philosophers
University of Ljubljana alumni